James Fletcher Hamilton Henderson (December 18, 1897 – December 29, 1952) was an American pianist, bandleader, arranger and composer, important in the development of big band jazz and swing music. He was one of the most prolific black musical arrangers and, along with Duke Ellington, is considered one of the most influential arrangers and bandleaders in jazz history. Henderson's influence was vast. He helped bridge the gap between the Dixieland and the swing eras. He was often known as "Smack" Henderson (because of smacking sounds he made with his lips).

Biography

James Fletcher Hamilton Henderson was born in Cuthbert, Georgia. He grew up in a middle-class African American family. His father, Fletcher Hamilton Henderson (1857–1943), was the principal of the nearby Howard Normal Randolph School from 1880 until 1942. His home, now known as the Fletcher Henderson House, is a historic site. His mother, a teacher, taught him and his brother Horace to play the piano. He began lessons by the age of six. His father would occasionally lock Fletcher in his room to practice for hours. By age 13, Henderson possessed a keen ability to read music and sense pitch. He pursued the studies with his mother and further engaged himself in lessons on European art.

Although a talented musician, Henderson decided to dedicate himself to mathematics and science. At age 18, he moved to Atlanta, Georgia, and changed his name to Fletcher Henderson, giving up James, his grandfather's name. He attended Atlanta University (where he was a member of the fraternity Alpha Phi Alpha) and graduated in 1920 with a bachelor's degree in chemistry and mathematics. After graduation, he moved to New York City with the intention of attending Columbia University for a master's degree in chemistry, but there is no evidence that he actually enrolled. He did get a part-time job as a lab assistant in a downtown Manhattan chemistry firm, but this only lasted a year.

In New York City, Henderson shared an apartment with a pianist who worked as a musician in a riverboat orchestra. When his roommate was too sick to perform, Henderson took his place, which soon gave him a job as a full-time replacement. In late 1920, he found work as a song demonstrator with the Pace and Handy Music Co. Henderson now found that music would be more profitable than chemistry and left his job as a laboratory chemist to begin a life in music. When Harry Pace left the company to start Black Swan Records, he took Henderson with him to be musical director, a job which lasted from 1921 until 1923. From 1920 to 1923, he primarily played piano accompaniment for blues singers. Henderson toured with the Black Swan Troubadours featuring Ethel Waters from October 1921 to July 1922. After hearing cornetist Louis Armstrong, then around 20 years old, in New Orleans while on tour in April 1922, Henderson sent him an offer, but Armstrong refused because Henderson would not hire Zutty Singleton as well.

His activities up to the end of 1923 were mainly recording dates for Black Swan and other labels. His band at this point was only a pick-up unit for recordings, not a regular working band. In January 1924, the recording band became the house band at the Club Alabam at 216 W. 44th St. Despite many erroneous publications indicating otherwise, this 1924 band was Henderson's first working band.

In July 1924, the band began a brief engagement at the Roseland Ballroom. Although only meant to stay for a few months, the band was brought back for the autumn season. Henderson called on Armstrong for a second time to join the band. On October 13, 1924, history was made when Henderson's band began their re-engagement at Roseland, with Armstrong now in the orchestra. The band quickly became known as the best African American band in New York. By late 1924, the arrangements by Don Redman were featuring more solo work.

Redman arranged Armstrong's repertoire with the King Oliver's Creole Jazz Band, such as turning "Dippermouth Blues" into "Sugar Foot Stomp". Armstrong played in the band for only a year, because he could not grow accustomed to the arrangements and to the "pretension" of the other band members.

Henderson's band boasted the formidable arranging talents of Don Redman. After Redman's departure from the band in 1927, Henderson took on some of the arranging, but Benny Carter was Redman's replacement as saxophone player and arranger from 1930–31, and Henderson also bought scores from freelance musicians (including John Nesbitt from McKinney's Cotton Pickers). Henderson developed his arranging skills from 1931 to the mid-1930s.

His band around 1925 included Armstrong, Howard Scott, Coleman Hawkins (who started with Henderson in 1923, playing the tuba parts on a bass saxophone, and quickly moving to tenor saxophone and a leading solo role), Charlie Dixon, Kaiser Marshall, Buster Bailey, Elmer Chambers, Charlie Green, and Ralph Escudero. In 1925, with Henry Troy, he wrote "Gin House Blues", recorded by Bessie Smith and Nina Simone, among others. His other compositions include "Soft Winds". Henderson recorded extensively in the 1920s for nearly every label, including Vocalion, Paramount, Columbia, Ajax, Pathé, Perfect, Edison, Emerson, Brunswick, and the dime-store labels Banner, Oriole, Regal, Cameo, and Romeo. From 1925 to 1930, he recorded primarily for Columbia and Brunswick/Vocalion under his own name and a series of acoustic recordings as the Dixie Stompers for Harmony Records and associated dime-store labels (Diva and Velvet Tone). Besides playing at the Roseland, Henderson played at the Savoy Ballroom in Harlem, playing until 3:30 in the morning.

During the 1930s, he recorded for Columbia, Crown (as "Connie's Inn Orchestra"), ARC (Melotone, Perfect, Oriole, Vocalion), Bluebird, Victor, and Decca. Starting in the early 1920s, he recorded popular hits and jazz tunes. In 1924 he and his band recorded 80 sides. His version of the pop tune "I Can't Get the One I Want", recorded about June 19, 1924, was issued on at least 23 labels.

In addition to Armstrong, lead trumpeters included Henry "Red" Allen, Joe Smith, Rex Stewart, Tommy Ladnier, Doc Cheatham and Roy Eldridge. Lead saxophonists included Coleman Hawkins, Buster Bailey, Benny Carter and Chu Berry. Sun Ra also worked as an arranger during the 1940s, during Henderson's engagement at the Club DeLisa in Chicago. Other jazz musicians who also played with Henderson included trumpeter Cootie Williams and trombonist Benny Morton.

Although Henderson's band was popular, he had little success in managing it and was still little-known outside of New York. His lack of recognition outside of Harlem had to do more with the times in which he lived, apparently lackluster management, and the hard times that resulted after the 1929 stock market crash. Henderson had a knack for finding talent, but he did not have much luck keeping it. On many occasions he lost talented members to other bandleaders. He also had trouble with finances. When the band split up in 1934, he was forced to sell some of his popular arrangements to Benny Goodman to keep them together.

After about 1931, his own arrangements became influential. In addition to arrangements for his band, he wrote arrangements for Teddy Hill, Isham Jones and Benny Goodman. His shoulder was injured in an auto accident in 1928. His wife, Leora, blamed the accident for his diminishing success. She said that John Hammond and Goodman bought Henderson's arrangements to support him, that Goodman always gave Henderson credit for the arrangements and said that he played them better than his own. In addition, Goodman and Hammond organized broadcasts and recordings to help Henderson when he was ill. 60 years later, two of his songs, "Queer Notions" and "Yeah, Man!" were performed in the Robert Altman film Kansas City (1996).

Benny Goodman
In 1935, Goodman's Orchestra was selected as a house band for the NBC radio program Let's Dance. Since Goodman needed new charts every week for the show, his friend John Hammond suggested that he purchase some from Henderson. Many of Goodman's hits from the swing era were played by Henderson, and his own band in the late 1920s and early 1930s, usually as head arrangements, which he transcribed from his own records and then sold to Goodman. However, his brother Horace Henderson recounted (in Ross Firestone's biography of Goodman, Swing, Swing, Swing) that the clarinetist made heavy demands on Henderson for fresh charts, while his band was engaged for the Let's Dance show in 1934–1935, and that he himself helped his brother complete some of them. The singer Helen Ward also stated that Henderson was delighted to hear the Goodman Orchestra realize his creations with such impeccable musicianship.

In 1939, Henderson disbanded his band and joined Goodman's, first as pianist and arranger and then working full-time as staff arranger. Henderson re-formed bands of his own several times in the 1940s and toured with Ethel Waters again in 1948 and 1949. He suffered a stroke in 1950, resulting in partial paralysis that ended his career as a pianist. He died in New York City in 1952, 11 days after his 55th birthday.

Contributions
Henderson, along with Don Redman, established the formula for swing music. The two broke the band into sections (sax section, trumpet section, etc). These sections worked together to create a unique sound. Sometimes, the sections would play in call-and-response style, and at other times one section would play supporting riffs behind the other.

Henderson was also responsible for bringing Louis Armstrong from Chicago to New York in October 1924, thus flipping the focal point of jazz in the history of the United States (although Armstrong left the band in November 1925 and returned to Chicago). He also played a key role in bringing improvisatory jazz styles from New Orleans and other areas of the country to New York, where they merged with a dance-band tradition that relied heavily on arrangements written out in musical notation.

Henderson created a band that was capable of playing dance music and complex arrangements. Louis Metcalf said: "The sight of Fletcher Henderson's men playing behind music stands brought on a learning-to-read-music kick in Harlem which hadn't cared before it. There were two years of real concentration. Everybody greeted you with 'How's studying?'"

A museum was established in Henderson's memory in his native Cuthbert, Georgia.

Selected discography
 A Study in Frustration, Columbia, 1961
 Hocus Pocus, Bluebird Records, 1992
 Tidal Wave, GRP, 1994
 Ken Burns Jazz: Fletcher Henderson, Columbia/Legacy, 2000
 Sweet and Hot, Le Chant du Monde, 2007
 First Impressions 1924–1931 Vol. 1, Decca Jazz Heritage Series, DL 9227
 Swing's the Thing 1931–1934 Vol. 2, Decca Jazz Heritage Series, DL 79228

As arranger for Benny Goodman Orchestra
 Sing, Sing, Sing (1992) (Bluebird/RCA)
 The Harry James Years, Vol. 1 (1993) (Bluebird/RCA)
 The Best of the Big Bands [under Goodman's name] (1933-1946/1989) (Columbia)
 Genius of the Electric Guitar (Recorded under Goodman sextet's name, released under Charlie Christian's name) (1939–1941/1990) (Columbia)

References

Further reading
Walter C. Allen, Hendersonia - The Music of Fletcher Henderson and his Musicians - a Bio-Discography (1973)
Jeffrey Magee, The Uncrowned King of Swing: Fletcher Henderson and Big Band Jazz (2004)
Margery Dews, "Remembering: The Remarkable Henderson Family"
Gunther Schuller, The Swing Era: The Development of Jazz, 1930-1945  (The History of Jazz, Vol. 2) (1989)
Scott Yanow, Swing: Third Ear - The Essential Listening Companion (2000)

External links

Fletcher Henderson Profiles in Jazz by Scott Yanow
Fletcher Henderson 1897-1952 Red Hot Jazz Archive

 Fletcher Henderson recordings at the Discography of American Historical Recordings.

African-American jazz composers
African-American jazz musicians
African-American jazz pianists
American jazz bandleaders
American jazz composers
American male jazz composers
American music arrangers
Big band bandleaders
Orchestral jazz musicians
Swing bandleaders
Swing pianists
Vaudeville performers
1897 births
1952 deaths
Jazz musicians from New York (state)
Musicians from New York City
Musicians from Georgia (U.S. state)
Clark Atlanta University alumni
Gennett Records artists
Paramount Records artists
Columbia Records artists
Vocalion Records artists
People from Cuthbert, Georgia
American jazz pianists
American male pianists
20th-century American conductors (music)
20th-century jazz composers
20th-century American pianists
20th-century American composers
20th-century American male musicians
20th-century African-American musicians